Viswajith C T is an Indian composer, singer and musician. He works in Malayalam Marathi Telugu films.

Career

Viswajith C T started his career by singing tracks for famous music composers Ramesh Narayan, M. G. Radhakrishnan and Thankaraj.
he composed music for several TV serials which include Pradakshinam, Nadakame Ulakam, Ammayodoppam, and Chanakyatantram.

His debut as a film music composer was in the 2005 film Oraal in which he composed the song 'Eni Entethu Mathram'.
He was asked to work for a Malayalam ghazal album featuring K. S. Chithra and Hariharan (Malhaar).
Then he composed music for a film Veeralipattu starring Prithviraj Sukumaran

Filmography

As music director (TV)

As music director (Film)

Recognition

 Kerala State Award for the Best Music Director 2009 (TV)
 Vayalar Award for the Best Music Director 2011 (TV)
 Kerala State Award for the Best Music Director 2014 and 2015 (TV)

References

External links

 

Living people
Musicians from Alappuzha
Indian male composers
Malayalam film score composers
Male film score composers
Year of birth missing (living people)